A nuclear electromagnetic pulse (nuclear EMP or NEMP) is a burst of electromagnetic radiation created by a nuclear explosion. The resulting rapidly varying electric and magnetic fields may couple with electrical and electronic systems to produce damaging current and voltage surges. The specific characteristics of a particular nuclear EMP event vary according to a number of factors, the most important of which is the altitude of the detonation.

The term "electromagnetic pulse" generally excludes optical (infrared, visible, ultraviolet) and ionizing (such as X-ray and gamma radiation) ranges. In military terminology, a nuclear warhead detonated tens to hundreds of miles above the Earth's surface is known as a high-altitude electromagnetic pulse (HEMP) device. Effects of a HEMP device depend on factors including the altitude of the detonation, energy yield, gamma ray output, interactions with the Earth's magnetic field and electromagnetic shielding of targets.

History 
The fact that an electromagnetic pulse is produced by a nuclear explosion was known in the earliest days of nuclear weapons testing. The magnitude of the EMP and the significance of its effects were not immediately realized.

During the first United States nuclear test on 16 July 1945, electronic equipment was shielded because Enrico Fermi expected the electromagnetic pulse. The official technical history for that first nuclear test states, "All signal lines were completely shielded, in many cases doubly shielded. In spite of this many records were lost because of spurious pickup at the time of the explosion that paralyzed the recording equipment." During British nuclear testing in 1952–1953, instrumentation failures were attributed to "radioflash", which was their term for EMP.

The first openly reported observation of the unique aspects of high-altitude nuclear EMP occurred during the helium balloon-lofted Yucca nuclear test of the Hardtack I series on 28 April 1958. In that test, the electric field measurements from the 1.7 kiloton weapon exceeded the range to which the test instruments were adjusted and was estimated to be about five times the limits to which the oscilloscopes were set. 
The Yucca EMP was initially positive-going, whereas low-altitude bursts were negative-going pulses. Also, the polarization of the Yucca EMP signal was horizontal, whereas low-altitude nuclear EMP was vertically polarized. In spite of these many differences, the unique EMP results were dismissed as a possible wave propagation anomaly.

The high-altitude nuclear tests of 1962, as discussed below, confirmed the unique results of the Yucca high-altitude test and increased the awareness of high-altitude nuclear EMP beyond the original group of defense scientists. The larger scientific community became aware of the significance of the EMP problem after a three-article series on nuclear EMP was published in 1981 by William J. Broad in Science.

Starfish Prime 

This demonstrated that the effects of a high-altitude nuclear explosion were much larger than had been previously calculated.

Starfish Prime was the first success in the series of United States high-altitude nuclear tests in 1962 known as Operation Fishbowl. Subsequent tests gathered more data on the high-altitude EMP phenomenon.

The Bluegill Triple Prime and Kingfish high-altitude nuclear tests of October and November 1962 in Operation Fishbowl provided data that was clear enough to enable physicists to accurately identify the physical mechanisms behind the electromagnetic pulses.

The EMP damage of the Starfish Prime test was quickly repaired due, in part, to the fact that the EMP over Hawaii was relatively weak compared to what could be produced with a more intense pulse, and in part due to the relative ruggedness (compared to today) of Hawaii's electrical and electronic infrastructure in 1962.

The relatively small magnitude of the Starfish Prime EMP in Hawaii (about 5.6 kilovolts/metre) and the relatively small amount of damage (for example, only 1% to 3% of streetlights extinguished) led some scientists to believe, in the early days of EMP research, that the problem might not be significant. Later calculations showed that if the Starfish Prime warhead had been detonated over the northern continental United States, the magnitude of the EMP would have been much larger (22 to 30 kV/m) because of the greater strength of the Earth's magnetic field over the United States, as well as its different orientation at high latitudes. These calculations, combined with the accelerating reliance on EMP-sensitive microelectronics, heightened awareness that EMP could be a significant problem.

Soviet Test 184 

In 1962, the Soviet Union performed three EMP-producing nuclear tests in space over Kazakhstan, the last in the "Soviet Project K nuclear tests". Although these weapons were much smaller (300 kiloton) than the Starfish Prime test, they were over a populated, large landmass and at a location where the Earth's magnetic field was greater. The damage caused by the resulting EMP was reportedly much greater than in Starfish Prime. The geomagnetic storm–like E3 pulse from Test 184 induced a current surge in a long underground power line that caused a fire in the power plant in the city of Karaganda.

After the collapse of the Soviet Union, the level of this damage was communicated informally to US scientists. For a few years US and Russian scientists collaborated on the HEMP phenomenon. Funding was secured to enable Russian scientists to report on some of the Soviet EMP results in international scientific journals. As a result, formal documentation of some of the EMP damage in Kazakhstan exists but is still sparse in the open scientific literature.

For one of the K Project tests, Soviet scientists instrumented a  section of telephone line in the area that they expected to be affected by the pulse. Each sub-line was protected by fuses and by gas-filled overvoltage protectors. The EMP from the 22 October (K-3) nuclear test (also known as Test 184) blew all of the fuses and destroyed all of the overvoltage protectors in all of the sub-lines.

Published reports, including a 1998 IEEE article, have stated that there were significant problems with ceramic insulators on overhead electrical power lines during the tests. A 2010 technical report written for Oak Ridge National Laboratory stated that "Power line insulators were damaged, resulting in a short circuit on the line and some lines detaching from the poles and falling to the ground."

Characteristics 
Nuclear EMP is a complex multi-pulse, usually described in terms of three components, as defined by the International Electrotechnical Commission (IEC).

The three components of nuclear EMP, as defined by the IEC, are called "E1", "E2" and "E3".

E1 
The E1 pulse is a very fast component of nuclear EMP. E1 is a brief but intense electromagnetic field that induces high voltages in electrical conductors. E1 causes most of its damage by causing electrical breakdown voltages to be exceeded. E1 can destroy computers and communications equipment and it changes too quickly (nanoseconds) for ordinary surge protectors to provide effective protection from it. Fast-acting surge protectors (such as those using TVS diodes) will block the E1 pulse.

E1 is produced when gamma radiation from the nuclear detonation ionizes (strips electrons from) atoms in the upper atmosphere. This is known as the Compton effect and the resulting current is called the "Compton current". The electrons travel in a generally downward direction at relativistic speeds (more than 90 per cent of the speed of light). In the absence of a magnetic field, this would produce a large, radial pulse of electric current propagating outward from the burst location confined to the source region (the region over which the gamma photons are attenuated). The Earth's magnetic field exerts a force on the electron flow at a right angle to both the field and the particles' original vector, which deflects the electrons and leads to synchrotron radiation. Because the outward traveling gamma pulse is propagating at the speed of light, the synchrotron radiation of the Compton electrons adds coherently, leading to a radiated electromagnetic signal. This interaction produces a large, brief, pulse.

Several physicists worked on the problem of identifying the mechanism of the HEMP E1 pulse. The mechanism was finally identified by Conrad Longmire of Los Alamos National Laboratory in 1963.

Longmire gives numerical values for a typical case of E1 pulse produced by a second-generation nuclear weapon such as those of Operation Fishbowl. The typical gamma rays given off by the weapon have an energy of about 2MeV (mega electron-volts). The gamma rays transfer about half of their energy to the ejected free electrons, giving an energy of about 1MeV.

In a vacuum and absent a magnetic field, the electrons would travel with a current density of tens of amperes per square metre. Because of the downward tilt of the Earth's magnetic field at high latitudes, the area of peak field strength is a U-shaped region to the equatorial side of the detonation. As shown in the diagram, for nuclear detonations in the Northern Hemisphere, this U-shaped region is south of the detonation point. Near the equator, where the Earth's magnetic field is more nearly horizontal, the E1 field strength is more nearly symmetrical around the burst location.

This means that most of the electrons are stopped by collisions with air molecules before completing a full spiral around the field lines.

This interaction of the negatively charged electrons with the magnetic field radiates a pulse of electromagnetic energy. The pulse typically rises to its peak value in some five nanoseconds. Its magnitude typically decays by half within 200 nanoseconds. (By the IEC definition, this E1 pulse ends 1000 nanoseconds after it begins.) This process occurs simultaneously on about 1025 electrons.  The simultaneous action of the electrons causes the resulting pulse from each electron to radiate coherently, adding to produce a single large amplitude, but narrow, radiated pulse.

Secondary collisions cause subsequent electrons to lose energy before they reach ground level. The electrons generated by these subsequent collisions have so little energy that they do not contribute significantly to the E1 pulse.

These 2 MeV gamma rays typically produce an E1 pulse near ground level at moderately high latitudes that peaks at about 50,000 volts per metre. The ionization process in the mid-stratosphere causes this region to become an electrical conductor, a process that blocks the production of further electromagnetic signals and causes the field strength to saturate at about 50,000 volts per metre. The strength of the E1 pulse depends upon the number and intensity of the gamma rays and upon the rapidity of the gamma-ray burst. Strength is also somewhat dependent upon altitude.

There are reports of "super-EMP" nuclear weapons that are able to exceed the 50,000 volts per metre limit by unspecified mechanisms. The reality and possible construction details of these weapons are classified and are, therefore, unconfirmed in the open scientific literature

E2 
The E2 component is generated by scattered gamma rays and inelastic gammas produced by neutrons. This E2 component is an "intermediate time" pulse that, by IEC definition, lasts from about one microsecond to one second after the explosion. E2 has many similarities to lightning, although lightning-induced E2 may be considerably larger than a nuclear E2. Because of the similarities and the widespread use of lightning protection technology, E2 is generally considered to be the easiest to protect against.

According to the United States EMP Commission, the main problem with E2 is that it immediately follows E1, which may have damaged the devices that would normally protect against E2.

The EMP Commission Executive Report of 2004 states, "In general, it would not be an issue for critical infrastructure systems since they have existing protective measures for defense against occasional lightning strikes. The most significant risk is synergistic because the E2 component follows a small fraction of a second after the first component's insult, which has the ability to impair or destroy many protective and control features. The energy associated with the second component thus may be allowed to pass into and damage systems."

E3 
The E3 component is different from E1 and E2. E3 is a much slower pulse, lasting tens to hundreds of seconds. It is caused by the nuclear detonation's temporary distortion of the Earth's magnetic field. The E3 component has similarities to a geomagnetic storm. Like a geomagnetic storm, E3 can produce geomagnetically induced currents in long electrical conductors, damaging components such as power line transformers.

Because of the similarity between solar-induced geomagnetic storms and nuclear E3, it has become common to refer to solar-induced geomagnetic storms as "Solar EMP". "Solar EMP" does not include E1 or E2 components.

Generation 
Factors that control weapon effectiveness include altitude, yield, construction details, target distance, intervening geographical features, and local strength of the Earth's magnetic field.

Weapon altitude 

According to an internet primer published by the Federation of American Scientists:

 A high-altitude nuclear detonation produces an immediate flux of gamma rays from the nuclear reactions within the device. These photons in turn produce high energy free electrons by Compton scattering at altitudes between (roughly) 20 and 40 km. These electrons are then trapped in the Earth's magnetic field, giving rise to an oscillating electric current. This current is asymmetric in general and gives rise to a rapidly rising radiated electromagnetic field called an electromagnetic pulse (EMP). Because the electrons are trapped essentially simultaneously, a very large electromagnetic source radiates coherently.

 The pulse can easily span continent-sized areas, and this radiation can affect systems on land, sea, and air. ...  A large device detonated at 400–500 km (250 to 312 miles) over Kansas would affect all of the continental U.S. The signal from such an event extends to the visual horizon as seen from the burst point.

Thus, for equipment to be affected, the weapon needs to be above the visual horizon.

The altitude indicated above is greater than that of the International Space Station and many low Earth orbit satellites. Large weapons could have a dramatic impact on satellite operations and communications such as occurred during Operation Fishbowl. The damaging effects on orbiting satellites are usually due to factors other than EMP. In the Starfish Prime nuclear test, most damage was to the satellites' solar panels while passing through radiation belts created by the explosion.

For detonations within the atmosphere, the situation is more complex. Within the range of gamma ray deposition, simple laws no longer hold as the air is ionised and there are other EMP effects, such as a radial electric field due to the separation of Compton electrons from air molecules, together with other complex phenomena.

Weapon yield 
This is roughly 50 to 500 times the size of the Hiroshima and Nagasaki bombs.

The EMP at a fixed distance from an explosion increases at most as the square root of the yield (see the illustration to the right). This means that although a  weapon has only  of the energy release of the  Starfish Prime test, the EMP will be at least  as powerful. Since the E1 component of nuclear EMP depends on the prompt gamma-ray output, which was only 0.1% of yield in Starfish Prime but can be  of yield in low-yield pure nuclear fission weapons, a  bomb can easily be  as powerful as the  Starfish Prime at producing EMP.

In the thermonuclear Starfish Prime the fission yield was less than 100% and the thicker outer casing absorbed about 95% of the prompt gamma rays from the pusher around the fusion stage. Thermonuclear weapons are also less efficient at producing EMP because the first stage can pre-ionize the air which becomes conductive and hence rapidly shorts out the Compton currents generated by the fusion stage. Hence, small pure fission weapons with thin cases are far more efficient at causing EMP than most megaton bombs.

This analysis, however, only applies to the fast E1 and E2 components of nuclear EMP. The geomagnetic storm-like E3 component of nuclear EMP is more closely proportional to the total energy yield of the weapon.

Target distance 
In nuclear EMP all of the components of the electromagnetic pulse are generated outside of the weapon.

For high-altitude nuclear explosions, much of the EMP is generated far from the detonation (where the gamma radiation from the explosion hits the upper atmosphere). This electric field from the EMP is remarkably uniform over the large area affected.

According to the standard reference text on nuclear weapons effects published by the U.S. Department of Defense, "The peak electric field (and its amplitude) at the Earth's surface from a high-altitude burst will depend upon the explosion yield, the height of the burst, the location of the observer, and the orientation with respect to the geomagnetic field. As a general rule, however, the field strength may be expected to be tens of kilovolts per metre over most of the area receiving the EMP radiation."

The text also states that, "...over most of the area affected by the EMP the electric field strength on the ground would exceed 0.5Emax. For yields of less than a few hundred kilotons, this would not necessarily be true because the field strength at the Earth's tangent could be substantially less than 0.5Emax."

(Emax refers to the maximum electric field strength in the affected area.)

In other words, the electric field strength in the entire area that is affected by the EMP will be fairly uniform for weapons with a large gamma-ray output. For smaller weapons, the electric field may fall at a faster rate as distance increases.

Super-EMP 
Also known as an "Enhanced-EMP", a super-electromagnetic pulse is a relatively new type of warfare in which a nuclear weapon is designed to create a far greater electromagnetic pulse in comparison to standard nuclear weapons of mass destruction. These weapons capitalize on the E1 pulse component of a detonation involving gamma rays, creating an EMP yield of potentially up to 200,000 volts per meter.  For decades, numerous countries have experimented with the creation of such weapons, most notably China and Russia.

China 
According to a statement made in writing by the Chinese military, the country has super-EMPs and has discussed their use in attacking Taiwan. Such an attack would debilitate information systems in the nation, allowing China to move in and attack it directly using soldiers. The Taiwanese military has subsequently confirmed Chinese possession of super-EMPs and their possible destruction to power grids.

In addition to Taiwan, the possible implications of attacking the United States with these weapons was examined by China. While the United States also possess nuclear weapons, the country has not experimented with super-EMPs and is hypothetically highly vulnerable to any future attacks by nations. This is due to the country's reliance on computers to control much of the government and economy. Abroad, U.S. aircraft carriers stationed within a reasonable range of an exploding bomb could potentially be subject to complete destruction of missiles on board, as well as telecommunication systems that would allow them to communicate with nearby vessels and controllers on land.

Russia 
Since the Cold War, Russia has experimented with the design and effects of EMP bombs. More recently, the country has performed several cyberattacks on the United States, which some analysts believe suggests possible future nationwide blackouts caused by super-EMPs, since Russia is known to possess them.  Along with ordinary warheads equipped with Super-EMP capabilities, Russia has been developing hypersonic missiles that, in 2021, are far more difficult for U.S. defenses in the form of radars and satellites to detect in a timely manner. This method makes the act of nuclear deterrence, which is a key strategy for the United States in preventing nuclear war, nearly impossible.

Plans of a device that is capable of placing a nuclear weapon into space were first introduced by the Soviet Union in 1962 when they developed a system, known as Fractional Orbital Bombardment System, to deliver nuclear weapons from above the Earth's atmosphere. Compared to super-EMPs that target ground operations, proposals have been made by Russia to develop satellites supplied with similar EMP capabilities.

Effects 
An energetic EMP can temporarily upset or permanently damage electronic equipment by generating high voltage and high current surges; semiconductor components are particularly at risk. The effects of damage can range from imperceptible to the eye, to devices literally blowing apart. Cables, even if short, can act as antennas to transmit pulse energy to the equipment.

Vacuum tube vs. solid state electronics 
Older, vacuum tube (valve)-based equipment is generally much less vulnerable to nuclear EMP than solid state equipment, which is much more susceptible to damage by large, brief voltage and current surges. Soviet Cold War-era military aircraft often had avionics based on vacuum tubes because solid-state capabilities were limited and vacuum-tube gear was believed to be more likely to survive.

Other components in vacuum tube circuitry can be damaged by EMP. Vacuum tube equipment was damaged in the 1962 testing. The solid state PRC-77 VHF manpackable two-way radio survived extensive EMP testing. The earlier PRC-25, nearly identical except for a vacuum tube final amplification stage, was tested in EMP simulators, but was not certified to remain fully functional.

Electronics in operation vs. inactive 
Equipment that is running at the time of an EMP is more vulnerable. Even a low-energy pulse has access to the power source, and all parts of the system are illuminated by the pulse. For example, a high-current arcing path may be created across the power supply, burning out some device along that path. Such effects are hard to predict and require testing to assess potential vulnerabilities.

On aircraft 
Many nuclear detonations have taken place using aerial bombs.

If the aircraft carrying the Hiroshima and Nagasaki bombs had been within the intense nuclear radiation zone when the bombs exploded over those cities, then they would have suffered effects from the charge separation (radial) EMP. But this only occurs within the severe blast radius for detonations below about  altitude.

During Operation Fishbowl, EMP disruptions were suffered aboard a KC-135 photographic aircraft flying  from the  detonations at  burst altitudes. The vital electronics were less sophisticated than today's and the aircraft was able to land safely.

Modern aircraft are heavily reliant on solid state electronics which are very susceptible to EMP blasts. Therefore, airline authorities are creating high intensity radiated fields (HIRF) requirements for new air planes to help prevent the chance of crashes caused by EMPs or electromagnetic interference (EMI). To do this all parts of the airplane must be conductive. This is the main shield from EMP blasts as long as there are no holes for the waves to penetrate into the interior of the airplane. Also, by insulating some of the main computers inside the plane also add an extra layer of protection from EMP blasts.

On cars 
An EMP would probably not affect most cars, despite modern cars' heavy use of electronics, because cars' electronic circuits and cabling are likely too short to be affected. In addition, cars' metallic frames provide some protection. However, even a small percentage of cars breaking down due to an electronic malfunction would cause traffic jams.

On small electronics 
An EMP has a smaller effect the shorter the length of an electrical conductor; though other factors affect the vulnerability of electronics as well, so no cutoff length determines whether some piece of equipment will survive. However, small electronic devices, such as wristwatches and cell phones, would most likely withstand an EMP.

On humans and animals 
Though electric potential difference can accumulate in electrical conductors after an EMP, it will generally not flow out into human or animal bodies, and thus contact is safe.

EMPs of sufficient magnitude and length have the potential to affect the human body. Possible side effects include cellular mutations, nervous system damages, internal burns, brain damage, and temporary problems with thinking and memory. However, this would be in extreme cases like being near the center of the blast and being exposed to a large amount of radiation and EMP waves.

A study found that exposure to 200–400 pulses of EMP caused the leaking of vessels in the brain, leakage that has been linked to small problems with thinking and memory recollection. These effects could last up to 12 hours after the exposure. Due to the long exposure time needed to see any of these effects it is unlikely that anyone would see these effects even if exposed for a small period of time. Also, the human body will see little effect as signals are passed chemically and not electrically making it hard to be affected by EMP waves.

Post–Cold War attack scenarios 
The United States EMP Commission was created by the United States Congress in 2001. The commission is formally known as the Commission to Assess the Threat to the United States from Electromagnetic Pulse (EMP) Attack.

The Commission brought together notable scientists and technologists to compile several reports. In 2008, the Commission released the "Critical National Infrastructures Report". This report describes the likely consequences of a nuclear EMP on civilian infrastructure. Although this report covered the United States, most of the information is applicable to other industrialized countries. The 2008 report was a follow-up to a more generalized report issued by the commission in 2004.

In written testimony delivered to the United States Senate in 2005, an EMP Commission staff member reported:

The United States EMP Commission determined that long-known protections are almost completely absent in the civilian infrastructure of the United States and that large parts of US military services were less-protected against EMP than during the Cold War. In public statements, the Commission recommended making electronic equipment and electrical components resistant to EMP – and maintaining spare parts inventories that would enable prompt repairs. The United States EMP Commission did not look at other nations.

In 2011, the Defense Science Board published a report about the ongoing efforts to defend critical military and civilian systems against EMP and other nuclear weapons effects.

The United States military services developed, and in some cases published, hypothetical EMP attack scenarios.

In 2016, the Los Alamos Laboratory started phase 0 of a multi-year study (through to phase 3) to investigate EMPs which prepared the strategy to be followed for the rest of the study.

In 2017, the US Department of Energy published the "DOE Electromagnetic Pulse Resilience Action Plan", Edwin Boston published a dissertation on the topic and the EMP Commission published "Assessing the threat from electromagnetic pulse (EMP)". The EMP commission was closed in summer 2017. They found that earlier reports had underestimated the effects of an EMP attack on the national infrastructure, highlighted issues with communications from the DoD due to the classified nature of the material, and recommended that the DHS instead of going to the DOE for guidance and direction should directly cooperate with the more knowledgeable parts of the DOE. Several reports are in process of being released to the general public.

Protecting infrastructure 
The problem of protecting civilian infrastructure from electromagnetic pulse has been intensively studied throughout the European Union, and in particular by the United Kingdom.

As of 2017, several power utility companies in the United States had been involved in a three-year research program on the impact of HEMP to the United States power grid led by an industry non-profit organization, Electric Power Research Institute (EPRI).

In 2018, the US Department of Homeland Security released the Strategy for Protecting and Preparing the Homeland against Threats from Electromagnetic Pulse (EMP) and Geomagnetic Disturbance (GMD), which was the Department’s first articulation of a holistic, long-term, partnership-based approach to protecting critical infrastructure and preparing to respond and recover from potentially catastrophic electromagnetic incidents.  Progress on that front is described in the EMP Program Status Report.

NuScale, the small modular nuclear reactor company from Oregon, US, has made their reactor resistant to EMP.

In fiction and popular culture 

By 1981, a number of articles on nuclear electromagnetic pulse in the popular press spread knowledge of the nuclear EMP phenomenon into the popular culture.  EMP has been subsequently used in a wide variety of fiction and other aspects of popular culture.

The popular media often depict EMP effects incorrectly, causing misunderstandings among the public and even professionals, and official efforts have been made in the United States to set the record straight. The United States Space Command commissioned science educator Bill Nye to narrate and produce a video called "Hollywood vs. EMP" so that inaccurate Hollywood fiction would not confuse those who must deal with real EMP events. The video is not available to the general public.

See also

References

Citations

Sources

Further reading 

 A 21st Century Complete Guide to Electromagnetic Pulse (EMP) Attack Threats, Report of the Commission to Assess the Threat to the United States from Electromagnetic ... High-Altitude Nuclear Weapon EMP Attacks (CD-ROM),  
 Threat posed by electromagnetic pulse (EMP) to U.S. military systems and civil infrastructure: Hearing before the Military Research and Development Subcommittee – first session, hearing held July 16, 1997,  
 Electromagnetic Pulse Radiation and Protective Techniques,

External links 

 GlobalSecurity.org – Electromagnetic Pulse: From chaos to a manageable solution
 Electromagnetic Pulse (EMP) and Tempest Protection for Facilities – U.S. Army Corps of Engineers
 EMP data from Starfish nuclear test measured by Richard Wakefield of LANL, and review of evidence pertaining to the effects 1,300 km away in Hawaii, also review of Russian EMP tests of 1962
 Read Congressional Research Service (CRS) Reports regarding HEMP
 MIL-STD-188-125-1
 How E-Bombs Work
 Commission to Assess the Threat to the United States from Electromagnetic Pulse (EMP) Attack
 NEMP and Nuclear plant
 U.S. Presidential Executive Order concerning EMP
 Protecting Electrical Equipment: good practice for preventing high altitude electromagnetic pulse impacts, De Gruyter, 2019

Electromagnetic radiation
Energy weapons
Nuclear weapons
Electromagnetic compatibility
Bombs
Electronic warfare
Pulsed power